Benjamin Smith (born August 27, 1971) is a Canadian businessman and airline executive. He has been the CEO of Air France-KLM since 2018. Prior to that, he was Air Canada's President, Airlines and Chief Operating Officer.

Personal and education

Benjamin Smith was born on August 27, 1971 in the UK, to a mother from Hong Kong and an Australian father. He holds a Bachelor of Arts in economics from the University of Western Ontario.

Aviation career
A life-long aviation enthusiast, he began his career in 1990 as a unionised ground Customer Sales and Service Agent at Air Ontario, a predecessor of Jazz and regional subsidiary of Air Canada Express, in parallel with his studies. In 1992, he left the airline to create a retail corporate travel agency, which he operated for eight years.

Air Canada
In 1999, he worked as a consultant for Air Canada before joining the airline. As Managing Director of Tango, he was responsible for writing the business plan and successfully launching the low-cost subsidiary in 2001, with the goal of reducing operating costs and experimenting with a new business model for the mainline carrier. Tango was the world's first legacy-airline creation to successfully demonstrate the viability and feasibility of branded fares and fare debundling (dissociation of individual products and services from the base fare, such as seat selection, checked baggage, and mileage accrual, which are subsequently sold as ancillaries).  Following the absorption of Tango into mainline Air Canada, Smith was appointed Vice President, Network Planning, within the company.

In 2007, Smith joined the Air Canada executive management team as Chief Commercial Officer, responsible for Network Planning, Revenue Management, Marketing (including brand management, customer experience, and loyalty), Cargo, Alliances, and Global Sales. He is described as the "driver of Air Canada's commercial strategy" leading to the development of three hubs in Toronto, Montreal, and Vancouver.  He contributed to the transformation of the airline, including the purchase of new wide-body and narrow-body aircraft, as well as the first flagship North American order of the Airbus A220 (previously known as the Bombardier C-Series). Overall, he led a global network expansion resulting in links to more than 200 destinations on six continents, with a fleet of 350 aircraft.

In 2013, he launched the low-cost company Air Canada Rouge.  

In 2014, he was the chief negotiator with the airline's pilot and cabin crew unions which resulted in landmark 10-year collective agreements.  In the same year, he was appointed President, Airlines (Air Canada, Rouge, Express and Cargo) and Chief Operating Officer of Air Canada.

Air France-KLM 
The Air France–KLM Group Board of Directors appointed Smith as the new Group's CEO on August 16, 2018, the first non-French chief executive in the company's history. He assumed this role on September 17, 2018.

In 2019, under Smith's direction that Air France announced the exit of the Airbus A380 at the beginning of the COVID-19 crisis, to be replaced by 38 Airbus A350 aircraft. He also oversaw the renewal of the narrowbody fleet with more environmentally friendly aircraft, with an order of 60 Airbus A220 aircraft to replace aging Airbus A318s and A319s.

In 2020, Smith announced the domestic deployment of Transavia France, previously limited to operating intra-European flights, following an agreement with the French pilot union permitting unrestricted growth of the fleet.

On March 31, 2022, the Board of Directors of Air France-KLM extended his term of office as CEO for a further five years.

References

External links 

Profile at Air France-KLM website

1971 births
Living people
Canadian airline chief executives
University of Western Ontario alumni
Air France–KLM
Canadian expatriates in France
British emigrants to Canada
British people of Hong Kong descent
British people of Australian descent
Canadian people of Hong Kong descent
Canadian people of Australian descent